Placental lactogen, also called chorionic somatomammotropin, is a polypeptide placental hormone, part of the somatotropin family. Its structure and function is similar to that of growth hormone. It modifies the metabolic state of the mother during pregnancy to facilitate the energy supply of the fetus.

For information on the human form, see human placental lactogen.

Placental lactogen I and II were identified as prolactin-like molecules that can bind to prolactin receptor with high affinity and mimic the actions of prolactin. These hormones can contribute to lactogenesis, luteal maintenance and progesterone production (in rats) during the later stages of gestation. Placental lactogen I may be important in stimulating mammary cell proliferation and in stimulating some of the adaptations of the maternal lipid and carbohydrate metabolism.

References

Hormones
Hormones of the pregnant female
Peptides